Vincent Atchouailou de Paul Angban (born 2 February 1985) is an Ivorian former professional footballer who played as a goalkeeper.

Club career

Rio Sports / Sabé Sports
Born in Yamoussoukro, Angban began his career in Rio Sport d'Anyama and was promoted to the first team in 2005. He left after two years in Anyama. Angban joined Sabé Sports for the 2006-07 season.

ASEC Mimosas
In 2007, Angban joined ASEC Mimosas. There, he was the first-choice goalkeeper until the beginning of the 2009 season, when Daniel Yeboah replaced him due to an injury. Yeboah convinced the manager of his qualities and stayed on the pitch when Angban was fit again. At the end of his contract with ASEC, Angban had trials with Africa Sports, Séwé Sports, Montreal Impact and Jeunesse, before signing permanently for Jeunesse.

Jeunesse Club d'Abidjan
Angban signed for Jeunesse, ASEC's rivals, after a successful trial at the end of his ASEC spell.

Later career
Angban played later for AFAD Djékanou, Africa Sports d'Abidjan and Simba Sports Club.

International career
Angban formerly played with the Ivory Coast at African U-20 Championship 2005 in Benin.
He represented his country at the 2008 Olympic Games.

Personal life
Angban's younger brother, Victorien, is also a professional footballer. He plays as a midfielder for Ligue 1 club FC Metz.

References

External links
Art Sport Player Profile

1985 births
Living people
Ivorian footballers
Ivory Coast international footballers
ASEC Mimosas players
Footballers at the 2008 Summer Olympics
Olympic footballers of Ivory Coast
2010 Africa Cup of Nations players
People from Yamoussoukro
Association football goalkeepers
2009 African Nations Championship players
Ivory Coast A' international footballers
Ivorian expatriate footballers
Ivorian expatriate sportspeople in Tanzania
Expatriate footballers in Tanzania
Simba S.C. players
Africa Sports d'Abidjan players